The 2019 Nigeria Professional Football League was the 29th season of the Nigeria Professional Football League, the top-tier football league in Nigeria, since the rebranding of the league as the "Professional League", and the 48th season of top-division football in Nigeria since its establishment in 1972. The season started on 13 January 2019.

Teams
The league consisted of 24 teams. Four were promoted from the Nigeria National League. Twenty teams remain from the previous season which was not completed. They are divided into two groups of 12 teams. The draw was held on 20 November 2018.

Group A
Wikki Tourists
Rivers United
Enugu Rangers
Niger Tornadoes
Lobi Stars
Katsina United
Kwara United
Sunshine Stars
Enyimba
MFM
Remo Stars
Bendel Insurance

Group B
Yobe Desert Stars
Go Round
Nasarawa United
Abia Warriors
Plateau United
FC Ifeanyi Ubah
Kano Pillars
Heartland
Akwa United
El Kanemi Warriors
Delta Force F.C.
Gombe United

Blue= Group A. Red= Group B

First stage

Group A

Group B

Championship playoff

References

Nigeria Professional Football League seasons
2018–19 in Nigerian football
Nigeria